Two Hearts or 2 Hearts may refer to:

Albums
 Two Hearts (Dave Mason album) or the title song, 1987
 Two Hearts (Jackie Evancho album), 2017
 Two Hearts (Men at Work album), 1985

Songs
 "Two Hearts" (The Charms song), or "Two Hearts, Two Kisses (Make One Love)", 1954
 "Two Hearts" (Cliff Richard song), 1988
 "Two Hearts" (John Parr song), 1986
 "Two Hearts" (Kish Mauve song), 2005; covered as "2 Hearts" by Kylie Minogue, 2007
 "Two Hearts" (Phil Collins song), 1988
 "Two Hearts" (Stephanie Mills song), 1981
 "Two Hearts" (Tohoshinki song), 2008
 "2 Hearts", by Digitalism from I Love You Dude, 2011
 "2 Hearts", by Sam Feldt and Sigma, 2020
 "2 Hearts", by Sugababes from Taller in More Ways, 2005
 "2 Hearts", by Toto from Kingdom of Desire, 1992
 "Two Hearts", by Anika Moa from Love in Motion, 2010
 "Two Hearts", by Bruce Springsteen from The River, 1980
 "Two Hearts", by Chris Isaak from San Francisco Days, 1993
 "Two Hearts", by Mango Groove from Mango Groove, 1989
 "Two Hearts", by Ryan Adams from Easy Tiger, 2007

Other uses
 Two Hearts (film), a 1943 Italian film directed by Carlo Borghesio
 2 Hearts (film), a 2020 American film directed by Lance Hool
 Two Hearts (story), a 2005 novelette by Peter S. Beagle

See also
 
 Two of Hearts (disambiguation)
 Time Lords, a fictional extraterrestrial race with two hearts in the TV series Doctor Who